Bochoř is a spa municipality and village in Přerov District in the Olomouc Region of the Czech Republic. It has about 1,000 inhabitants.

Spa
Bochoř is a minor spa municipality. The spa is one of the oldest in Moravia as it was first mentioned in 1580. Since 2010 it has been a property of the Bochoř municipality. The spa specialises in treating musculoskeletal disorders and rheumatic diseases.

References

Villages in Přerov District
Spa towns in the Czech Republic